The Crane Group Companies (also known as Crane Group) of Columbus, Ohio, USA, is a holding company of operating units primarily involved in the manufacturing and distribution of building products. Products include wood composite decking and railing, exterior cladding products, vinyl fencing, OEM PVC profiles, wood doors and door-frames, and vinyl sheet piling. The group also has several service units in the roofing, security gate systems, and steel I-beam markets. While the holding company resides in Columbus, the units operate in many other locations including: Columbus, Wilmington, and Mason, Ohio and Atlanta, Georgia.

Founded by Robert S. Crane Sr. in 1947, the company has remained a private, family operated business, with Tanny B. Crane as CEO. The company employs over 1300, mostly in Ohio. The company has strong links to Ohio State University, Boards of Ohio companies and philanthropy in Ohio.

Operating units
Crane Investment Company
Crane Building Products
Exterior Portfolio
EverMark
Crane Renovation Group
Able Roof
Armor Distribution
Contractors Inc.
Mr. Roof
Responsiv Disaster Recovery
Crane Service Companies
Suburban Steel Supply
Signature Control Systems
Crane Marine Products
Crane Materials International

References

Companies based in the Columbus, Ohio metropolitan area
Manufacturing companies established in 1947
Privately held companies based in Ohio
1947 establishments in Ohio